PB-2 Zhob is a constituency of the Provincial Assembly of Balochistan.

General elections 2018
General elections were held on 25 July 2018.

See also

 PB-1 Sherani-cum-Zhob
 PB-3 Killa Saifullah

References

External links
 Election commission Pakistan's official website
 Awazoday.com check result
 Balochistan's Assembly official site

Constituencies of Balochistan